A floating island is a mass of floating aquatic plants, mud, and peat ranging in thickness from several centimeters to a few meters. Floating islands are a common natural phenomenon that are found in many parts of the world. They exist less commonly as an artificial phenomenon. Floating islands are generally found on marshlands, lakes, and similar wetland locations, and can be many hectares in size.

Natural occurrences

Sometimes referred to as tussocks, floatons, or suds, natural floating islands are composed of vegetation growing on a buoyant mat of plant roots or other organic detritus. 
In aquatic regions of Northwestern Europe several hundred hectares or thousand acres of floating meadows (German Schwingrasen, Dutch trilveen) have been preserved, which are partly used as agricultural land, partly as nature reserves.

They typically occur when growths of cattails, bulrush, sedge, and reeds extend outward from the shoreline of a wetland area. As the water gets deeper the roots no longer reach the bottom, so they use the oxygen in their root mass for buoyancy, and the surrounding vegetation for support to retain their top-side-up orientation. The area beneath these floating mats is exceptionally rich in aquatic lifeforms. Eventually, storm events tear whole sections free from the shore, and the islands thus formed migrate around a lake with changing winds, eventually either reattaching to a new area of the shore or breaking up in heavy weather.

Some cenotes in northern Mexico have natural floating islands.

In the Brazilian Amazon, floating islands form in lakes on the floodplains of white-water rivers and are known as Matupá and range in size from a few square meters to a few hectares.

As decaying mass decomposes it releases gases which keep the bog floating.

Pumice rafts

Another type of natural floating island is the pumice raft, which is created by an explosive volcanic eruption, and can float on the ocean for months or even years before becoming fully saturated and sinking. They may assist in the migration of plants and animals.

Artificial islands 

Floating artificial islands are generally made of bundled reeds, and the best known examples are those of the Uros people of Lake Titicaca, Peru, who build their villages upon what are in effect huge rafts of bundled totora reeds. The Uros originally created their islands to prevent attacks by their more aggressive neighbours, the Incas and Collas.

The Aztec capital, Tenochtitlan, was surrounded with chinampas, small artificial islands used for agriculture known as "floating gardens" (though not really floating). Floating gardens on a large scale have been demonstrated with aquaponics systems in China growing rice, wheat and canna lily on islands, with some installations exceeding .

Spiral Island was a more modern one-person effort to build an artificial floating island, on the Caribbean coast of Mexico. Modern artificial islands mimicking the floating reedbeds of the Uros are increasingly used by local governments and catchment managers to improve water quality at source, reducing pollutants in surface water bodies and providing biodiversity habitat. Examples include Gold Coast City Council in Australia. Artificial floating reedbeds are commonly anchored to the shoreline or bottom of water body, to ensure the system does not float away in a storm event or create a hazard.

During World War II, the British Project Habakkuk proposed the construction of aircraft carriers made of ice-like Pykrete. Its size and speed made it more of an artificial iceberg or island than a ship.

Commercial development of floating islands has begun taking place. Floating habitat islands were installed with salicornia salt marsh plants at Sydney Olympic Park Authority in 2011 providing nesting sites for local and migratory birds including black swans, black-winged stilts, red-necked avocets, Pacific black ducks and chestnut teals, using the Aqua Biofilter product. The world's largest vegetated floating islands  in size were installed in 2004 using Aqua Biofilter™ product with Canna (plant) at Lake Tai, China using materials including a combination of polyurethane open cell filter foam, closed cell polyethylene flotation foam, bamboo and coconut fibre filter foam mix with wicking ability to supply water to plant roots.

A commercially produced floating island was installed in the river otter enclosure at Zoo Montana in 2007. In 2009 and the beginning of 2010, a few larger islands were launched to provide nesting habitat for Caspian tern colonies. The largest of the islands, at a record-setting , was launched into the water at Sheepy Lake. These islands are a collaboration between the United States Army Corps of Engineers, Oregon State University, and Floating Islands West, a Floating Island International license holder.

A recent US Army Corps of Engineers project was built in The Hideout, Pennsylvania as part of a watershed management project. The floating island was created to mimic nature; help improve water quality, including reducing phosphorus levels; and buffer habitats against surges in nutrients and pollution.

Buoyancy in artificial floating reedbeds is commonly provided by polyethylene or polyurethane foam, or polyethylene plastic containing air voids. Growth media include coconut fibre; mats made of polyester or recycled PET bottles; synthetic geotechnical mat; jute; soil; and sand. 

Artificial floating islands are sometimes made by planting cattails and other plants on floating plastic rafts in order to reduce phosphorus levels in the water.   In Cleveland's Cuyahoga River floating rafts were made to restore fish populations.

Locations

Africa
 Lake Victoria, Uganda
 Lake Kyoga, Uganda
 Lake Malawi, Africa
 Lake Upemba, Democratic Republic of the Congo
 Lake Chad, Chad, Niger, Nigeria and Cameroon
 Hartbeespoort Dam, North West, South Africa

Asia

 Loktak Lake in Manipur state, India
 Prashar Lake at Mandi in Himachal Pradesh state, India
 Chamli gul, Takab, Iran
 Maldives Floating City, Maldives
 Inle Lake, Myanmar
 Çat Lake, Çelikhan, Adıyaman, Turkey
 Aksakal Lake, Solhan, Bingöl, Turkey

Australia

 Lagoon of Islands, Tasmania, Australia

Europe 
 Danube Delta, Romania
 Lake Visitor, Montenegro
 Marais Audomarois, France
 Vlasina Lake, Serbia
 Semeteš Lake, Serbia
 Sommen, Sweden
 Das schwimmende Land, Waakhausen, Germany
 Schwimmendes Moor, Jade, Germany
 Waterland, The Netherlands
 Lochan Saorach, Scotland
 Swiebodzinka, Poland

North America
 Lake Yarbo, Winter Garden, Florida
 Lake Buckeye, Winter Haven, Florida
 Lake Idyl, Winter Haven, Florida
 Lake Mary Jane, Orlando, Florida
 Umbagog Lake, Maine and New Hampshire, United States
 Mill Pond, Alton, New Hampshire
 Island Pond, Springfield, Massachusetts, United States
 Prairie Lake, Barron County, Wisconsin, United States
 Bolton Lakes, Bolton and Vernon, Connecticut, United States
 Lake Ontario, New York, United States and Ontario, Canada
 Whitingham, Vermont Lake Sadawga
 Kettle Moraine, Wisconsin, United States
 Duwamish River, Seattle, Washington, United States

South America
 Lake Titicaca, Bolivia and Peru
 , Argentina

See also 
 Artificial island
 Crannog
 Freedom Ship
 Great Raft
 Perelandra
 Pumice raft
 Seasteading

References

External links 

 Inca Heartland: A site with numerous pictures of floating artificial islands on Lake Titicaca.
 Tourism Keeping Peruvian Islands Afloat article by Roderick Eime
 "Disagreement on whether to tether island that floats free in Massachusetts pond": San Francisco Chronicle
 Floating on an island

Islands by type